The Holstein interglacial ( or Holstein-Interglazial), also called the Mindel-Riss interglacial (Mindel-Riß-Interglazial) in the Alpine region, is the third to last major interglacial before the Holocene, the present warm period. It followed directly after the Elster glaciation and came before the Saale glaciation, during the Middle Pleistocene. The more precise timing is controversial since Holstein is commonly correlated to two different marine isotope stages, MIS 11 (424–374 thousand years ago) and MIS 9 (337–300 thousand years ago). This ambiguity is much related to the correlation problem described in more detail in the article 'Elster glaciation'.

Definition 
The Holstein interglacial is defined by marine sedimentation. On the stratigraphic record at the natural monument of :de:Sievertsche Tongrube in Hamburg-Hummelsbüttel, its development is traced from the Elster ice age (Lauenburg clay) through the start of the warm period (freshwater depositions) to its flooding by the Holstein Sea (Cardien Sands).

See also 
 Timeline of glaciation

References

Literature 
 Hallik, R. (1960): Die Vegetationsentwicklung der Holstein-Warmzeit in Nordwestdeutschland und die Altersstellung der Kieselgurlager der südlichen Lüneburger Heide. – Zeitschrift der Deutschen Geologischen Gesellschaft 112: 326–333.

External links 
 data sheet for the Holstein interglacial in Central Germany

Quaternary
Ice ages
Interglacials